Dreikanter Head is a dark triangular headland between the mouths of Hunt Glacier and Marston Glacier, on the west side of Granite Harbour, Victoria Land. The triangular appearance of the feature when viewed from the southeast suggests the name; "Dreikantig" is a German word meaning triangular.

References 

Headlands of Victoria Land
Scott Coast